Bloodsworth Island is an island in the Chesapeake Bay. It lies in southern Dorchester County, Maryland.  Historic research suggests that sites discovered in an archaeological investigation of the northern third of the island were associated with families who worked in the nineteenth-century Chesapeake Bay oystering industry.

History

Bloodsworth Island Range
From 1942 to 1995, the United States Navy used the island as a shore bombardment and bombing range for firing and dropping live ordnance from ships and aircraft.  This included bombs, small and large caliber ammunition, rockets, and missiles that contained explosives, propellants, and other energetics.  Due to extensive contamination by unexploded ordnance, the island is currently off-limits to the public.

In popular culture
The episode "What We Become" in the AMC original series The Walking Dead features the island as a major location. Newcomer Virgil says he is from a community living on Bloodsworth Island and he is trying to return. The episode ends with Michonne (Danai Gurira) accompanying Virgil, presumably to return to Bloodsworth Island to obtain weapons. In the final episode of the show, Rick Grimes is shown on the island after having seemingly escaped from the Civic Republic.

External links
 Bloodsworth Island Range Safety Bulletin

Gallery

References
Merriam-Webster's Geographical Dictionary, Third Edition. Springfield, Massachusetts: Merriam-Webster Incorporated, 1997. .

Maryland islands of the Chesapeake Bay
Landforms of Dorchester County, Maryland
Uninhabited islands of Maryland